Savona Cathedral is a Roman Catholic cathedral in Savona, Liguria, Italy, dedicated to the Assumption of the Virgin Mary. Formerly the episcopal seat of the Diocese of Savona, since 1986 it has been the seat of the Bishops of Savona-Noli.

Roman Catholic cathedrals in Italy
Cathedrals in Liguria
Churches in the province of Savona
Savona
Baroque architecture in Liguria
Church buildings with domes
Minor basilicas in Liguria